The Beggar Student is a 1956 West German musical film directed by Werner Jacobs and starring Gerhard Riedmann, Waltraut Haas and Elma Karlowa. It is based on the operetta Der Bettelstudent by Karl Millöcker, and is part of the operetta film tradition. It was shot at the Bavaria Studios and the Carlton Studios in Munich. The film's sets were designed by the art director Felix Smetana.

Synopsis
After a Polish aristocrat refuses to marry a Colonel, he manoeuvres to force her to marry a penniless student in revenge.

Cast
 Gerhard Riedmann as Symon Rymanowicz
  Waltraut Haas as Komtesse Laura
  Elma Karlowa as Komtesse Bronislawa
  Gunther Philipp as Jan Janicki
  Gustav Knuth as Oberst Ollendorf
  Fita Benkhoff as Gräfin Palmatica
 Rudolf Vogel as Enterich
  Alice Kessler as Mira
  Ellen Kessler as Katja
  Dick Price as Graf Kaminsky
 Karl Lieffen as Major Wangenheim
 Joost Siedhoff as Leutnant Schweinitz
 Willem Holsboer
 Ulla Torp
 Johannes Buzalski
 Michael Friederichsen
 Adalbert Fuhlrott
 Peter Mühlen

References

External links

1956 films
German historical musical films
West German films
1950s German-language films
Films directed by Werner Jacobs
Films set in Poland
Films set in the 1700s
Remakes of German films
Operetta films
Films based on operettas
1950s historical musical films
Constantin Film films
1950s German films
Films shot at Bavaria Studios